ACS Chemical Neuroscience is a monthly peer-reviewed scientific journal published by the American Chemical Society. It covers research on the molecular underpinnings of nerve function. The journal was established in 2010. The founding editor-in-chief was Craig W. Lindsley (Vanderbilt University), the current editor-in-chief is Jacob Hooker (Harvard Medical School).

According to the Journal Citation Reports, the journal has a 2021 impact factor of 5.780.

Types of content
The journal publishes research letters, articles, and review articles. In addition, specially commissioned articles that describe journal content and advances in neuroscience are solicited.

References

External links

Chemical Neuroscience
Neuroscience journals
Monthly journals
English-language journals
Publications established in 2010